Konch is a community development block of Gaya district in Bihar, India. Konch(Konch Village/Konch Panchayat/Konch Thana-Police Station) is a typical village market area slowly taking shape of a sub-urban settlement and centre of small business (mainly shops selling items such as grocery, building materials, agricultural inputs like fertilizer, seeds, small farm equipments etc.). Konch has very important temple known as Koncheswar Mahadev belonging to the later Gupta period which now has been taken under the protection of Archaeological Survey of India (ASI).

Konch has a varied demographic mix of population and is home of people from different Hindu castes and religions. It is house of a few historic relics like Shiva Temple on the outskirts of the block. Konch has a small Muslim population also and is a model of the Hindu-Muslim unity that is common to India. Konch has a well maintained government hospital, high schools, Government Primary/Middle Schools and police station.

Mostly undeveloped due to lack of infrastructure like roads, electricity and urbanization the block and adjoining villages have seen the worst times during the height of naxalite problem in central Bihar. Be it the Bara Massacre or the Jail Break in adjoining Jehanabad District naxalites were able to tear apart the very basic roots of development and peace in this block as well as the district.

The situation has changed after the last assembly election and now developmental work seems to have subdued some of the ill-effects of the reign of terror. Implementation of central as well as state projects is paving the way for development and prosperity of the area. The reference of this block comes into various development related projects like Rajiv Gandhi Gramin Vidyutikaran Yojna or The Pradhan Mantri Gram Sadak Yojana

Geography 
Konch is located at latd = 25  | latm = 01  | lats = 09  | latNS = N|
longd =  86| longm = 46  | longs = 39  | longEW = E|
locator_position = right |

Transportation 
Gaya is well connected to the rest of India and the world by roadways, railways and airways. Konch is only 28 kilometers from Gaya town.

Air: The nearest airport from Konch is Gaya International Airport and Patna Airport.  Indian Airlines, Indigo, Jet Airways, Kingfisher Airlines connect Patna to Calcutta, Bombay, Delhi, Ranchi, Lucknow and various other cities.
Rail: The nearest railway station is Gaya. Gaya is the second most important and largest railway station in Bihar after Patna. It is a junction and is connected to all the four metropolis New Delhi, Kolkata, Mumbai and Chennai through Important Broad Gauge Routes (direct trains).
Road: Konch is well connected by road to Gaya, Patna, Aurangabad 
Local Transport: City Bus, Taxis, Tongas, Auto Rickshaws, Cycle Rickshaws are available.
Bus : Regular direct bus services are available from Gaya, Patna, Ranchi, Tata(Jamshedpur), Dhanbad, Aurangabad. Bihar State Tourism Development Corporation and Bihar State Road Transport Corporation (Book online ticket: http://gauravluxury.com/)  run buses to connect Gaya from Patna, Ranchi, Jamshedpur and other major cities.

Prominent Villages in the Block 

DADREJI, Tetariya, Jaitiya, Kaudia, Iguna, Parsawan, Murera, Adai, Tankuppa & Ghorhan. Parsawan is one of the panchayat in Konch. 
Tetariya village is near Konch- known due to ITI College which is under construction.

Lodipur is one of the villages with above average literacy rate in the Konch block. Moke & Lodipur are closely connected through relations & culture. It is connected by road with Gaya district and Aurangabad district of Bihar. It is located on a state highway.
Konch Bihar Legislative Assembly MLA is Anil Kumar 
The village Konch figures in the recent release of Pradhan Mantri Gramin Sadak Yojna data release by the Government of India.

Mananpur (also referred as Madanpur), Korap, Mudera, Angra, Aanti, Maduka are some of the big villages of Konch blocks.

Parihans and Korap has the history of producing a pool of talents and eminent personalities like Late Kali Prasad (ICS/IAS), Shri Balmiki Prasad Sharma (IPS), Shri Ramanugrah Sharma (Educationist) among other notable people. Parihans has the distinction of birthplace of freedom fighter Vir Shri Keswar Singh who was a close associate of Swami Sahajanand Saraswati and Subhas Chandra Bose and an important leader of Kisan andolan during the freedom struggle in Magadh region.Late Ramdutt singh was a Freedom Fighter in Konch  . It has also been the place where prominent freedom fighters and social reformers like Swami Sahajanand Saraswati, Jay Prakash Narayan, and Vinoba Bhave have spent considerable amount of time.

Aanti is a very big village, dominated by Rajputs and has a credential of good residential schools in the area.
Mahmudpur is also a well-known village in the area and so is Maduka with a huge proportion of the population being that of Pathans.

Dadreji is emerging as the new semi-urban center for the cluster of nearby villages. major population of village is hindu upper caste , Bhumihar Brahmans presence is dominant here.

Education 
Schools: affiliated with Bihar Board of Education
 Gandhi High School, Konch Bazaar ( selected as a MODEL school )
 Saraswati Shishu Mandir, Konch Bazaar
 Government Middle School, Konch Bazaar
Government Middle School,Dadreji
 Government Girls Middle School, Konch Dih
 Kasturba Gandhi Vidyalay,Konch Dih
 Government Girls High School, Konch Dih
 Bal sramik vidyalay ,konch dih

Financial Institutions 
 State Bank of India
 Madhya Bihar Gramin Bank
 Indian Postal Office
 Punjab National Bank

Religious Places 
 Koncheswar Mahadeva Lingam Temple: Koncheswar Mandir brings to mind the image of the Mahabodhi temple at BodhGaya. Temple was built in 8th century A.D(Moreover, tradition points to Bhairavendra, who lived about 1459 A.D., as the builder of the Konch temple). The temple is built of properly shaped, well-burnt bricks though of different sizes. Some bricks measure 11" X 5½" X 2¾", some 9" X 4¾" X 2¾" and others 13" X 7½" X 2¾". The use of different types of bricks is, perhaps, an indication that the temple has undergone extensive repairs from time to time, as held by Cunningham and Beglar of the Archaeological Survey of India. J.D. Beglar, Assistant Archaeological Suryeyor at that time, had visited the place during 1872-73 and he has mentioned in his report(1878)that the tower was surmounted by a cylindrical pinnacle as in the case of the temple of BodhGaya. This pinnacle had a hemispherical top. The Koncheswar temple is representation of the Dashavataras. The most interesting piece inside the shrine is a panel sculpture of the Dashavataras representing Vishnu. This temple of Shiva worship is clearly of Brahmanical origin.
 Radha-Krishna Thakurwari Konch Bazaar(Founder: Late Nirdhin Sharma; situated on Konch Bazaar-Middle School Road)
 Konch Sun Temple (Surya Mandir)Konch Bazaar (situated next to Konch Bus stand- Talab)
 Devi Sthan Mandir Konch Bazaar (situated next to Government Middle School)
 Sarswati Mandir Konch Dih (situated next to Konch Tekari Road)
 Konch Masjid (Mosque)Konch Bazaar

References

Community development blocks in Gaya district